Dmitry Kovalyov may refer to:

 Dmitry Kovalyov (handballer) (born 1982), Russian handball player
 Dmitry Kovalyov (rower) (born 1976), Russian rower
 Dmitry Kovalyov (volleyball) (born 1991), Russian volleyball player